This is a list of Italian desserts and pastries. Italian cuisine has developed through centuries of social and political changes, with roots as far back as the 4th century BCE. Italian desserts have been heavily influenced by cuisine from surrounding countries and those that have invaded Italy, such as Greece, Spain, Austria, and France. Italian cuisine is also influenced by the Mediterranean climate and agriculture.

Characteristics
Italy has an extremely diverse range of cuisines, due to the large amount of influences throughout its history. Peaches, lemons, and pears are popular fruits for recipes, as well as sweet cheeses, such as ricotta and marscapone. Coffee, especially espresso, are integral to Italian culture and cuisine, and is featured frequently in dessert recipes, such as tiramisu. The usage of a cold dairy dessert, such as ice cream or gelato, was introduced to the Western world through Italy.

Italian desserts

A

B

C

F

G

L

M

N

P

R

S

T

U

Z

Italian pastries

 Baci di Dama 
 Baicoli
 Biscotti
 Biscotti Regina
 Bocconotto
 Bombolone
 Cannoli
 Ciarduna
 Nocciolini di Canzo
 Pandoro
 Pevarini
 Pignolata
 Pignolo
 Pizzelle
 Sfinge
 Sfogliatelle
 Torta caprese
 Zeppole
 Zippuli

See also

 Cuisine
 List of desserts
 List of Italian dishes – Desserts and pastry
 Sicilian cuisine – Desserts and sweets

References

External links
 

Desserts And Pastries
Italian

Articles containing video clips